Blues Brothers and Friends: Live from Chicago's House of Blues is the eleventh album and fourth live album by The Blues Brothers in 1997. It was recorded at the opening of the House of Blues in Chicago and is the first recording to feature James Belushi, performing under the name "Zee Blues". It is also the first album to feature original keyboardist Paul Shaffer since their earlier live recording Made in America in 1980. A number of prominent guests joined the band on stage, including Joe Walsh, Billy Boy Arnold, Charley Musselwhite, Jeff Baxter and Sam Moore. This is also the first album to feature Tommy "Pipes" McDonnell, who had replaced Larry Thurston as lead vocalist.

Track listing 
 "Intro"
 "Green Onions"
 "Chicken Shack"
 "Sweet Home Chicago"
 "I Wish You Would" (featuring Billy Boy Arnold)
 "Messin' with the Kid" (featuring Sergei Varonov) 
 "All My Money Back" (featuring Lonnie Brooks)
 "Born In Chicago" (featuring Charlie Musselwhite)
 "Blues, Why You Worry Me?" (featuring Charlie Musselwhite)
 "Groove With Me Tonight" (featuring Syl Johnson)
 "634-5789" (featuring Eddie Floyd)
 "All She Wants to Do Is Rock" (featuring Tommy "Pipes" McDonnell)
 "Flip, Flop and Fly"
 "Money (That's What I Want)" (featuring Sam Moore, Jeff Baxter and Tommy "Pipes" McDonnell)
 "Viva Las Vegas" (featuring Sam Moore,  Jeff Baxter and Tommy "Pipes" McDonnell)

Personnel 
 Elwood Blues – Vocals, Harmonica
 Brother Zee Blues – Vocals, Harmonica
 Matt "Guitar" Murphy – Lead Guitar
 Steve "The Colonel" Cropper – Guitar
 Donald "Duck" Dunn – Bass guitar
 Lou "Blue Lou" Marini – Tenor & Alto Saxophones
 Alan "Mr. Fabulous" Rubin – Trumpet
 Paul "The Shiv" Shaffer – keyboards, Background Vocals
 Danny "G-Force" Gottlieb - drums
 Birch "Crimson Slide" Johnson - Trombone
 Leon Pendarvis - Keyboards
 Tommy "Pipes" McDonnell - percussion, Lead & Background Vocals
 Joe Walsh - Guitar
 Billy Boy Arnold - guitar, vocals
 Charley Musselwhite - harmonica
 Jeff Baxter - guitar
 Sam Moore - vocals
 Eddie Floyd - vocals
 Syl Johnson - vocals
 Sergei Varonov - vocals

References

External links 
 Album page at Blues Brothers Central

The Blues Brothers albums
1997 live albums
A&M Records live albums
Albums recorded at the House of Blues